HIDPoint is proprietary Linux software for USB Keyboards and Mice. Currently it supports most Logitech keyboards and mice. It runs on many Linux distributions such as RHEL, SUSE, Ubuntu and Fedora. HIDPoint has been designed to give users using USB Mice and Keyboards the same experience they get when using these devices on Microsoft Windows.

Features 
 Allows users to fully utilize the functionality provided by their hardware.
 Allows full use of Multimedia buttons, “Office” keys, and Programmable keys.
 Users have the same experience as in Windows.
 Single binary distribution for all supported Operating systems.
 GUI Installer and Uninstaller.
 No run time dependencies to install.

Currently supported platforms 
 Ubuntu 10.10 (Maverick Meerkat)
 Ubuntu 10.04 (Lucid Lynx) 
 Ubuntu 9.10 (Karmic Koala)
 Ubuntu 9.04 (Jaunty Jackalope)
 Linux Mint 9 (Isadora)
 Linux Mint 8 (Helena)
 Linux Mint 7 (Gloria)
 Linux Mint 6 (Felicia)
 Debian 5
 Red Hat Enterprise Linux 5.0
 Red Hat Enterprise Linux 4.0
 CentOS 5.0
 Suse 10.2
 Suse 10.1 
 Suse 10.0  
 Mandriva 2008 and 2010
 Fedora Core 6.0
 Fedora Core 4.0

SMP (multi-processor/multi-core) are not yet supported.
64bit drivers are available for selected Platforms.

Currently supported mice 
 Logitech Cordless Mouse for Notebooks
 Logitech Cordless Click
 Logitech MX 1000 Laser Mouse
 Logitech Media Play Cordless
 Logitech V500 Cordless Mouse
 Logitech G3/MX518 Optical Mouse
 Logitech Cordless Click Plus
 Logitech V200 Cordless Mouse
 Logitech Cordless Mini Optical Mouse
 Logitech LX7 Cordless Optical Mouse
 Logitech LX5 Cordless Optical Mouse
 Logitech G5 Laser Mouse
 Logitech G7 Laser Mouse
 Logitech MX610 Laser Cordless Mouse
 Logitech MX610 Left Handed Laser Cordless Mouse
 Logitech G1 Optical Mouse
 Logitech MX400 Laser Mouse
 Logitech G3 Laser Mouse
 Logitech V450 Laser Mouse
 Logitech VX Revolution
 Logitech MX Air mouse
 Logitech MX Revolution
 Logitech MX 600 Cordless Laser
 Logitech LX7 Cordless Laser Mouse
 Logitech MX 620 Cordless Laser
 Logitech V220 Cordless Optical
 Logitech LX8 Cordless Optical Mouse
 Logitech VX Nano
 Logitech LX8 Cordless Optical Mouse
 Logitech LX6 Cordless Optical Mouse
 Logitech V450 Laser Mouse
 Logitech MX 700 Cordless Optical Mouse
 Logitech MX 900

Currently supported keyboards 
 Logitech LX 500 Cordless Keyboard
 Logitech LX 501 Cordless Keyboard
 Logitech LX 300 Cordless Keyboard
 Logitech Numeric Keypad
 Logitech Cordless Ultra Flat Keyboard
 Logitech EX 110 Series Keyboard
 Logitech Media Keyboard Elite
 Logitech MX 3000 Keyboard
 Logitech S510 Keyboard
 Logitech Comfort Keyboard
 Logitech LX 710 Keyboard
 Logitech MX 3200 Keyboard
 Logitech Easy Call Keyboard
 Logitech Wave Cordless Keyboard
 Logitech Wave Corded  Keyboard

Other keyboard/mice software 
 Microsoft IntelliPoint
 Logitech SetPoint

External links 
 HIDPoint download page

Linux software